Diven is a surname. Notable people with the surname include:

Alexander S. Diven (1809–1896), American politician and Union Army officer
Frank Diven (1859–1914), American baseball player
John M. Diven (1852–1925), American engineer
Michael Diven (1970-2020), American politician

See also
Divens